Fountains of Rome, P 106, is a tone poem in four movements completed in 1916 by the Italian composer Ottorino Respighi. It is the first of his three tone poems about Rome, preceding Pines of Rome (1924) and Roman Festivals (1928). Each movement depicts a setting at one of Rome's fountains at a different time of the day, specifically the Valle Giulia, Triton, Trevi, and Villa Medici. The premiere was held at the Teatro Augusteo on 11 March 1917, with Antonio Guarnieri conducting the Augusteo Orchestra. Respighi was disheartened at its initial mild reception and put away the score, until the piece was re-evaluated by the public following a February 1918 performance by conductor Arturo Toscanini which brought the composer international fame. The piece was published by Casa Ricordi in 1918.

Structure 
The work has four movements:

Instrumentation
Fountains of Rome calls for the following large orchestra, including piano, celesta, harps, chimes, and organ ad lib.:

woodwinds: piccolo, 2 flutes, 2 oboes, English horn, 2 clarinets in B-flat and A, bass clarinet in B-flat and A, 2 bassoons
brass: 4 French horns in F, 3 trumpets in B-flat and A, 3 trombones, tuba
percussion: timpani, cymbals, triangle, bell in D, glockenspiel
keyboards: organ (ad lib.), piano, celesta
strings: 2 harps, violins i, ii, violas, violoncellos, double basses

It was also transcribed for piano four hands (duet) by the composer.

Performances, reception, and recordings
Arturo Toscanini originally planned to conduct the work in 1916, but the Italian composer refused to appear for the performance after a disagreement over his having included some of Wagner's music on a program played during World War I. Consequently, it did not premiere until March 11, 1917, at the Teatro Augusteo in Rome, with Antonio Guarnieri as conductor. Although the premiere was unsuccessful, Toscanini finally conducted the work in Milan in 1918 with tremendous success. It "was acclaimed [as] one of the loveliest of symphonic writings".

The piece was first performed in the United States on February 13, 1919. Toscanini recorded the music with the NBC Symphony Orchestra in Carnegie Hall in 1951; the high fidelity monaural recording was issued on LP and then digitally remastered for release on CD by RCA Victor.  The work has since become one of the most eminent examples of the symphonic poem.

References

 Program notes by Stephanie von Buchau, written for Deutsche Grammophon's production of the recording by the Berlin Philharmonic, conducted by Herbert von Karajan.

External links 
 

1916 compositions
Symphonic poems by Ottorino Respighi
Music for orchestra and organ
Music about Rome
Fountains in Rome
Orchestral suites